Sandra Oh and Awkwafina are starring in an upcoming untitled American comedy film directed by Jessica Yu and written by Jen D'Angelo.  The film also stars Jason Schwartzman, Tony Hale, Holland Taylor, and Will Ferrell, who is also producing with Jessica Elbaum. It is set to be released by 20th Century Studios as a Hulu original film in 2023.

Premise
Anne, a tightly wound, game show-obsessed woman, must come together with her chaotic sister Jenny in order to help pay off their mother's gambling debts. When Anne's beloved dog is kidnapped, they will have to set off on a cross-country journey in order to get the money they need. In order to do so, they will have to tap into Anne's skill set by turning her into the game show champion she was always meant to be.

Cast
 Sandra Oh as Anne
 Awkwafina as Jenny
 Jason Schwartzman
 Tony Hale
 Holland Taylor
 Will Ferrell

Production
In October 2020, it was announced that an untitled comedy film was in development at Netflix, with Jen D'Angelo writing the screenplay, and Sandra Oh and Awkwafina starring. In December 2021, Netflix reportedly left the film, and the rights were acquired by 20th Century Studios. Jessica Yu was also set to direct. Will Ferrell and Jessica Elbaum will produce the film under their Gloria Sanchez Productions banner with Artists First as Alex Brown will serve as an executive producer. Sarah Shepard will oversee the film for 20th Century.

Filming began by June 7, 2022, in Los Angeles, with production expected to last until July 22, 2022. Production would also occur in New Orleans. By the beginning of production, Holland Taylor, Jason Schwartzman, Tony Hale, and Ferrell were revealed to star in the film.

Release
The film is set to be released by 20th Century Studios as a Hulu original film in the United States in 2023.

References

External links
 

Upcoming films
2023 films
2023 comedy films
2020s American films
2020s comedy road movies
2020s English-language films
20th Century Studios films
American comedy road movies
Films about dogs
Films about games
Films about sisters
Films directed by Jessica Yu
Films produced by Will Ferrell
Films shot in Los Angeles
Films shot in New Orleans
Gloria Sanchez Productions films
Hulu original films
Upcoming English-language films